The fourth Women's U.S. Cup tournament held in 1998, were joined by four teams: Brazil, Russia, Mexico and USA.

Mia Hamm of USA scored her one hundredth career international goal at the 1998 U.S. Cup, against Russia.

Matches

Final placing

Goal scorers

References 

1998
1998 in women's association football
1998 in American women's soccer
1998–99 in Mexican football
1998 in Brazilian football
1998 in Russian football
September 1998 sports events in the United States